Auty is a small village commune located in the Tarn-et-Garonne department in the northern Occitanie region of southern France.

See also
Communes of the Tarn-et-Garonne department

References

Communes of Tarn-et-Garonne